Gulskogen Station is located in the village of Gulskogen in Drammen, Norway on the Sørlandet Line, on a section previously regarded as the Randsfjorden Line. The station is served by local trains between Kongsberg via Oslo to Eidsvoll operated by Vy.

History
The station was opened in 1868, two years after Randsfjorden Line was completed.

Railway stations in Buskerud
Railway stations on the Randsfjorden Line
Railway stations on the Sørlandet Line
Railway stations opened in 1868
1868 establishments in Norway